Donald Allen Oreck (August 31, 1930 — March 5, 2006) was an American actor who, between 1955 and 1961, played supporting roles in numerous television series and made uncredited appearances in a few feature films.

A native of Los Angeles, California, Oreck became a member of the Los Angeles Police Department following a stint in the United States Army. While continuing his service with law enforcement, he began taking small acting assignments, which gradually increased in importance until, in the late 1950s, he could be spotted in various installments of television programs. 

In 1959, Oreck and his wife invested in the film You Hurt, I Cry. He also acted in the film, and she was the producing coordinator. Also in 1959, Oreck portrayed the lead in the episode "Gringo Pete" of Rex Allen's syndicated western series Frontier Doctor.

Personal life
Oreck had two children, Kevin and Elizabeth .He died on March 5, 2006, after having had a degenerative brain disease.

Selected filmography 
 1951 short film Santa and the Fairy Snow Queen
1955 film Target Zero
 1956 episode of Studio 57
 1956 episode of The West Point Story
 1958 episode of State Trooper
 1959 episode of M Squad
 1958 episode of Sea Hunt
 1959 episode of Men into Space
 1960 episode of Checkmate
 1961 episode of Bonanza

References

External links

1930 births
2006 deaths
American male film actors
American male television actors
Deaths from neurodegenerative disease
Neurological disease deaths in California
Male actors from Los Angeles
United States Army soldiers
American police officers
20th-century American male actors